Amata waldowi is a moth of the family Erebidae. It was described by Karl Grünberg in 1907. It is found in Cameroon, the Democratic Republic of the Congo and Togo.

References

 

waldowi
Moths described in 1907
Moths of Africa